Carlos Enrique Ruiz Fuller (September 23, 1916 – March 28, 1997) was a Chilean geologist and mining engineer noted for his planning and direction of the Institute of Geological Investigations of Chile and his pioneering surveying and mapping of Chile's metal deposits in the 1960s. He was also the head of the geology sector of the Production Development Corporation (CORFO) and undersecretary at the Ministry of Mining of Chile between 1954 and 1957.

The mineral carlosruizite was named after him in 1994.

References

1916 births
1997 deaths
20th-century Chilean geologists
University of Chile alumni